Muncho Lake/Mile 462 Water Aerodrome  is an aerodrome in north-eastern British Columbia, Canada.

Accidents and incidents
 8 July 2007, a Liard Air de Havilland Canada DHC-6 Twin Otter, registration C-FAWC took off from Muncho Lake for a flight to Prince George, British Columbia, crashing immediately after takeoff, killing one of the three passengers (from thermal burns). Piloting the aircraft were two crewmembers, who survived the crash. The takeoff was attempted from a 950-foot private airstrip across from the lodge instead of the more-appropriate 1,800-foot gravel strip one mile south. A video of the crash shows the aircraft struggling for altitude as its right wing hits the ground, followed by the plane's wing hitting a power pole, snagging its recently decommissioned power line, spinning clockwise and impacting trees, followed by a fire.

References

Seaplane bases in British Columbia
Northern Rockies Regional Municipality
Registered aerodromes in British Columbia